Bernard Taylor (born June 26, 1957) is an American former professional boxer. As an amateur, he won a gold medal at the 1979 Pan American Games and a silver at the 1975 Pan American Games.

Amateur career
Taylor had an incredible career as an amateur boxer, compiling a record of 481-8. Taylor qualified for the 1980 U.S. Olympic team but was unable to compete due to the 1980 Summer Olympics boycott. In 2007, he received one of 461 Congressional Gold Medals created especially for the spurned athletes.

Amateur Highlights
1972 National Junior Olympics Light Flyweight champion
1976 Duel Soviet Union vs USA-Moscow January 24
1976 National AAU Bantamweight champion
1976 National Golden Gloves Bantamweight champion
1977 National Golden Gloves Featherweight champion
1978 National Golden Gloves Featherweight champion
1979 National AAU Featherweight champion
1980 National Golden Gloves Featherweight champion.

Professional career
Taylor turned pro in 1980 and was undefeated in 18 fights when he was given a shot at Panama's Eusebio Pedroza for the W.B.A. featherweight championship of the world. The fight took place in Taylor's hometown of Charlotte, North Carolina in October 1982. After building a lead in the first ten rounds of the fight, Taylor faded down the stretch and had to settle for a draw. Three years later, Taylor was still undefeated in  34 fights (33-0-1) when he was given another shot at the WBA featherweight championship. This time, the champion was Ireland's Barry McGuigan, who had dethroned Pedroza 3 months earlier. Taylor failed to come out for the 9th round, and lost via TKO. After several years and a couple of lengthy layoffs, Taylor earned a 3rd opportunity at a world championship against IBF junior lightweight champion John John Molina in 1993.  Taylor again came up short via TKO in the 8th round. He retired following a loss in his next bout in 1994. Taylor did manage to win the NABF featherweight and the USBA junior lightweight titles, coming from behind to stop Calvin Grove in the latter fight.

References

 

1957 births
Living people
Boxers from North Carolina
Featherweight boxers
Super-featherweight boxers
Sportspeople from Charlotte, North Carolina
American male boxers
African-American boxers
Boxers at the 1975 Pan American Games
Boxers at the 1979 Pan American Games
Pan American Games gold medalists for the United States
Pan American Games silver medalists for the United States
Pan American Games medalists in boxing
Medalists at the 1975 Pan American Games
Medalists at the 1979 Pan American Games
21st-century African-American people
20th-century African-American sportspeople